Zinc finger protein 275 is a protein that in humans is encoded by the ZNF275 gene.

Function

This gene encodes a zinc finger protein that appears to be conserved in eutheria. Its function has not yet been established.

References

Further reading